DoubleThink is the third album from hip hop artist Akala. It was released on 3 May 2010 by Illa State Records. The title refers to doublethink, a plot element in George Orwell's dystopian novel, Nineteen Eighty-Four. Akala noted this novel, Aldous Huxley’s Brave New World and Yevgeny Zamyatin’s We as stimulus for the album's dystopian qualities.

Track listing

Footnotes

2010 albums
Akala (rapper) albums